The least gerbil (Gerbillus pusillus) is distributed mainly in South Sudan, southwestern  Ethiopia, Kenya, and Tanzania.

References

Musser, G. G. and M. D. Carleton. 2005. Superfamily Muroidea. pp. 894–1531 in Mammal Species of the World a Taxonomic and Geographic Reference. D. E. Wilson and D. M. Reeder eds. Johns Hopkins University Press, Baltimore.
  Database entry includes a brief justification of why this species is of least concern
  Database entry includes a brief justification of why this species is of least concern

Gerbillus
Rodents of Africa
Mammals described in 1878
Taxa named by Wilhelm Peters